The 1873 Vienna World's Fair was the large world exposition that was held in 1873 in the Austria-Hungarian capital Vienna. Its motto was "Culture and Education".

History
As well as being a chance to showcase Austro-Hungarian industry and culture, the World's Fair in Vienna commemorated Franz JosephI's 25th year as emperor. The main grounds were in the Prater, a park near the Danube River, and preparations cost £23.4 million. It lasted from May 1st to November 2nd, hosting about 7,225,000 visitors.

Facilities
There were almost 26,000 exhibitors housed in different buildings that were erected for this exposition, including the Rotunda, a large circular building in the great park of Prater designed by the Scottish engineer John Scott Russell. (The fair Rotunda was destroyed by fire on 17 September 1937.)

Russian pavilion
The Russian pavilion had a naval section designed by Viktor Hartmann. Exhibits included models of the Port of Rijeka and the Illés Relief model of Jerusalem.

Japanese pavilion 
The Japanese exhibition at the fair was the product of years of preparation. The empire had received its invitation in 1871, close on the heels of the Meiji Restoration, and a government bureau was established to produce an appropriate response. Shigenobu Okuma, Tsunetami Sano, and its other officials were keen to use the event to raise the international standing of Japanese manufactures and boost exports. 24 engineers were also sent with its delegation to study cutting-edge Western engineering at the fair for use in Japanese industry. Art and cultural relics at the exhibit were verified by the Jinshin Survey, a months-long inspection tour of various imperial, noble, and temple holdings around the country. The most important products of each province were listed and two specimens of each were collected, one for display in Vienna and the other for preservation and display within Japan. Large-scale preparatory exhibitions with this second set of objects were conducted within Japan at the Tokyo Kaisei School (today the University of Tokyo) in 1871 and at the capital's Confucian Temple in 1872; they eventually formed the core collection of the institution that became the Tokyo National Museum. 

Forty-one Japanese officials and government interpreters, as well as six Europeans in Japanese employ, came to Vienna to oversee the pavilion and the fair's cultural events. 25 craftsmen and gardeners created the main pavilion, as well as a full Japanese garden with shrine and a model of the former pagoda at Tokyo's imperial temple. Apart from the collection of regional objects, which focused on ceramics, cloisonné wares, lacquerware, and textiles, the displays also included the female golden shachi from Nagoya Castle and a papier-maché copy of the Kamakura Buddha. The year after the fair, Sano compiled a report on it which ran to 96 volumes divided into 16 parts, including a strong plea for the creation of a museum on western lines in the Japanese capital; the government further began hosting national industrial exhibitions at Ueno Park in 1877.

Ottoman pavilion 
Osman Hamdi Bey, an archaeologist and painter, was chosen by the Ottoman government as commissary of the empire's exhibits in Vienna. He organized the Ottoman pavilion with Victor Marie de Launay, a French-born Ottoman official and archivist, who had written the catalogue for the Ottoman Empire's exhibition at the 1867 Paris World's Fair. The Ottoman pavilion, located near the Egyptian pavilion (which had its own pavilion despite being a territory of the Ottoman Empire), in the park outside the Rotunde, included small replicas of notable Ottoman buildings and models of vernacular architecture: a replica of the Sultan Ahmed Fountain in the Topkapı Palace, a model Istanbul residence, a representative Turkish bath, a cafe, and a bazaar. The 1873 Ottoman pavilion was more prominent than its pavilion in 1867. The Vienna exhibition set off Western nations' pavilions against Eastern pavilions, with the host, the Austro-Hungarian Empire, setting itself at the juncture between East and West. A report by the Ottoman commission for the exhibition expressed a goal of inspiring with their display "a serious interest [in the Ottoman Empire] on the part of the industrialists, traders, artists, and scholars of other nations...."

The Ottoman pavilion included a gallery of mannequins wearing the traditional costumes of many of the varied ethnic groups of the Ottoman Empire. To supplement the cases of costumes, Osman Hamdi and de Launay created a photographic book of Ottoman costumes, the Elbise-i 'Osmaniyye (Les costumes populaires de la Turquie), with photographs by Pascal Sébah. The photographic plates of the Elbise depicted traditional Ottoman costumes, commissioned from artisans working in the administrative divisions (vilayets) of the Empire, worn by men, women, and children who resembled the various ethnic and religious types of the empire, though the models were all found in Istanbul. The photographs are accompanied by texts describing the costumes in detail and commenting on the rituals and habits of the regions and ethnic groups in question.

Italian pavilion
Professor Lodovico Brunetti of Padua, Italy first displayed cremated ashes at the exhibition. He showed a model of the crematory, one of the first modern ones. He exhibited it with a sign reading, "Vermibus erepti, puro consummimur igni," in english, "Saved from the worms, we are consumed by the flames."

New Zealand pavilion 
New Zealand was represented at the 1873 Vienna International Exposition by a collection of Māori clubs, mats and cloaks, as well as gold, woodwork, kauri gum and geological specimens.  Photographs of New Zealand scenery were shown and examples of flour and beer were provided by local industries.  A collection of birds was prepared by a London taxidermist and Emperor Franz Joseph I of Austria-Hungary was said to have been "astonished" by a pair of moa skeletons from the Canterbury Museum.  More than 50 awards were collected by New Zealand exhibitors but, apparently, because of a problem of categorisation on the part of the jurors, the moa display was not among them.

Gallery

Impact on Vienna
The exhibition led to an intensive building activity in the years before. The new train station to Germany, the Nordwestbahnhof, was completed just prior to the fair.

See also
 New Zealand Interprovincial Exhibition (prepratory event in New Zealand)
 Yushima Seidō Exposition (preparatory event in Japan)

References

Citations

Bibliography
 .

External links
Official website of the BIE 

The Rotunda of the 1873 Vienna International Exhibition
Images from the exhibition
1873 Vienna (BIE World Expo) - approximately 90 links

1873 in Austria
1870s in Vienna
1873 festivals
AH